Ikalamavony is a small town in Haute Matsiatra region, in the hills of southern central Madagascar with a population of 35,114 in 2018. The district has a total population of 151,056 inhabitants. With 10,163 km2 it occupies almost half of the surface of Haute Matsiatra. The capital of the district is Ikalamavony.

Communes
The district is further divided into eight communes:

 Ambatomainty - (45 km from Ikalamavony)
 Fitampito - (50 km from Ikalamavony)
 Ikalamavony
 Mangidy - (35 km from Ikalamavony)
 Solila - (46 km from Ikalamavony)
 Tanamarina Sakay
 Tanamarina (also named Tanamarina Bekisopa)
 Tsitondroina

Roads
The partly unpaved National road 42 links the town to  Isorana and Fianarantsoa (90 km).

Rivers
Matsiatra in the North, and the  Mananantanana river in the South cross the district. The Zomandao river is another river of importance.

References

Districts of Haute Matsiatra